Raquel Cabezón Muñoz is a former Spanish football midfielder. She played for RCD Espanyol, FC Barcelona and Levante in Spain's Superliga Femenina.

She was a member of the Spanish national team.

International goals
1999 FIFA Women's World Cup play-off
 1 in Spain 4–1 Scotland (1998)
2001 Euro play-off
1 in Denmark 4–2 Spain (2000)
Torneo de Maspalomas
1 in Spain 2–2 Finland (2002)
 2007 WC Q
 1 in Finland 0–1 Spain (2005)
 1 in Spain 3–2 Belgium (2005)
 1 in Spain 7–0 Poland (2006)

Titles
 1 Spanish League (2008)
 2 Spanish Cups (1996, 1997)

References

1978 births
Living people
Spanish women's footballers
Spain women's international footballers
Primera División (women) players
FC Barcelona Femení players
RCD Espanyol Femenino players
Levante UD Femenino players
Women's association football midfielders
Footballers from Barcelona
Sportswomen from Catalonia
21st-century Spanish women